The Beach handball at the Asian Beach Games is a Beach handball competition of the Asian Beach Games. It was first held in 2008.

Summary

Men

Women

Medal table

Participating nations

Men

Women

References
2012 Men, Women
2014 Men, Women

External links
Asian Handball Federation

 

 
Beach handball
Beach handball at multi-sport events
Asian Beach Games